Sentral Niu Ailan Rural LLG is a local government area in New Ireland Province, Papua New Guinea. The LLG administers the central area of the island of New Ireland especially the people of Barok, Mandak, Kuot, Notsi and the Tabar Group. The LLG is located in Namatanai District and the LLG headquarters is Konos. 

The mainland section of the LLG is accessible by road from Kavieng and is bordered by Tikana Rural LLG in the north and Namatanai Rural LLG in the south. The population of the LLG is 29,932 as of the 2011 PNG National Census. It is mooted to be an electorate of its own  to be known as "Sentral Niu Ailan Open" Seat in 2022 depending on the Electoral Boundaries Commission Review after the 2017 General Elections.

The Kuot language is spoken in the northern part of the LLG.

The current LLG president is Graham Lali who defeated Toligai Tioti Soka during the 2013 LLG Elections.

Wards
01. Simberi
02. Tatau
03. Datava
04. Mapua
05. Wang
06. Tandis
07. Lossu
08. Konos
09. Kimadan
10. Lelet
11. Dalom
12. Lemeris
13. Bulu
14. Karu
15. Komalu
16. Komalapuo (including Kalagunan village)
17. Daun
18. Messi
19. Ugana
20. Lamau
21. Patlanga
22. Panaras (Kuot language speakers)

References

Local-level governments of New Ireland Province